Guardians is an Off-Broadway play written by Peter Morris. It debuted at the 2005 Edinburgh Festival Fringe, winning the "Fringe First Award" and made its New York debut on April 11, 2006 at The Culture Project.

Synopsis
In London, a tabloid journalist finds an opportunity to further his career by manufacturing photographs supposedly depicting British soldiers abusing Iraqi prisoners. He is identified only as "English Boy". This story is intercut with the confessional monologue of a young United States Army soldier from West Virginia who becomes a scapegoat in a scandal involving photographs of actual abuse. She is identified only as "American Girl".

It is later revealed that English Boy is a sexual sadist, taking pleasure in torturing his partners and taking advantage of his boyfriend's masochism for his own pleasure. It is also revealed that American Girl had an abusive sexual relationship with a superior officer. It is implied that these relationships may have furthered the main characters' descent.

Inspiration
The story of American Girl is loosely based on that of Lynndie England, who was convicted of misconduct in the prisoner abuse scandal at Abu Ghraib prison in Iraq. That of the British journalist is based on a 2004 scandal at The Daily Mirror, where a fabricated photograph depicting Iraqi abuse at British soldiers' hands was published.

Karen J. Greenberg—who is Director of the Center on National Security at Fordham University's School of Law and the author of The Torture Papers: The Road to Abu Ghraib, The Torture Debate in America, and Al Qaeda Now—praised Morris's play highly, and published an article on Peter Morris and Guardians, in which she claims that the play represents a "truly profound" analysis of America's role in, and response to, the Abu Ghraib scandal. Greenberg's article, entitled "Split Screens", originally appeared in The American Prospect magazine; it is included in a 2007 book of essays entitled "One of the Guys: Women as Aggressors and Torturers", edited  by Tara McKelvey with foreword by Barbara Ehrenreich and afterword by Cynthia Enloe.  Greenberg's essay concludes with this praise for the play:

"Who, really, are the victimizers? ... The answer is complex, but would come to light with some clarity in an independent investigation or Congressional inquiry ... Until this occurs, however, the American public will have to glean what it can from the words of a playwright."  (Greenberg, "Split Screens")

August - September 2005 Edinburgh Fringe / London Run

Actors
Hywel John - English Boy
MyAnna Buring - American Girl

The play premiered at the Pleasance at the 2005 Edinburgh Festival Fringe, and immediately transferred to The Latchmere Theatre in London. It received a Scotsman Fringe First Award and was the runner-up for the Amnesty International Freedom of Expression Award.

April 11, 2006 - May 25, 2006 Culture Project Run

Actors
Lee Pace - English Boy
Katherine Moennig - American Girl

Note: Lee Pace was nominated for a 2007 Lucille Lortel award for Outstanding Actor in a Lead Role for his performance.

Personnel
Peter Morris - Writer
Jason Moore - Director
Richard Hoover - Set Designer
Garin Marschall - Lighting
Michelle R. Philips - Costume Designer
Thomas J. Gates - Production Stage Manager
Culture Project - General Manager

May 8, 2006 - May 10, 2006 Newrite Theatre Company (Taunton, UK) Run
(Repeated again on July 28, 2006 as part of the Westival-the Arts Fest of the West.)

Actors
James Foster now known as James Garland - English Boy
Rebecca Wearing - American Girl

Personnel
Peter Morris - Writer
Sebastian Petit - Director
Sebastian Petit - Set Designer
Sebastian Petit - Lighting
Brewhouse Theatre/Robert Miles - Director

July 2, 2008 - July 5, 2008 Manhattan Theatre Source 
Actors
Zack Abramowitz - English Boy
Meryl Sykes - American Girl

Personnel
Peter Morris - Writer
Joseph Giardina - Director
Stephanie Caragliano - Stage Manager
Alex Casagrande - Lighting

References

New York Times Guardians review
Manhattan Theatre Source Homepage

Off-Broadway plays
British plays
2005 plays